The Pont Ruzizi I is a bridge in Bukavu  which serves as one of the borders customs between Democratic Republic of Congo in the town of Bukavu and Rwanda in the city of Cangungu over the Ruzizi River.

This bridge was first built in 1935 and after a long time it was destroyed to be rebuilt in 1974 in metals and wood with a capacity to support only lesser weight vehicles or carrying less than 3 tons. It was for a long time that it was still in a state of disrepair before the construction of this new bridge, of capicite to support up to 30 tons, does not intervene in 2012. This with the financing of the European Union in the economic program of the Economic Community of the Great Lakes Countries. It was inaugurated with Mayor Bilubi Ulengabo Meschac on June 19, 2019.

The bridge being 57 m long, it is the second longest bridge in Bukavu, after Pont Ruzizi II, which also serves as borders customs with Rwanda.

See also
 Ruzizi River
 Pont Ruzizi II
 Pont Ruzizi III

References

Ruzizi
Bridges in Rwanda
Bridges in the Democratic Republic of the Congo